Ranunculales is an order of flowering plants in the eudicots. It is the most basal clade in this group – it is the sister taxon to the remaining eudicots. The anthophytes are a grouping of plant taxa bearing flower-like reproductive structures. They were formerly thought to be a clade comprising plants bearing flower-like structures.  The group contained the angiosperms - the extant flowering plants, such as roses and grasses - as well as the Gnetales and the extinct Bennettitales.

23,420 species of vascular plant have been recorded in South Africa, making it the sixth most species-rich country in the world and the most species-rich country on the African continent. Of these, 153 species are considered to be threatened. Nine biomes have been described in South Africa: Fynbos, Succulent Karoo, desert, Nama Karoo, grassland, savanna, Albany thickets, the Indian Ocean coastal belt, and forests.

The 2018 South African National Biodiversity Institute's National Biodiversity Assessment plant checklist lists 35,130 taxa in the phyla Anthocerotophyta (hornworts (6)), Anthophyta (flowering plants (33534)), Bryophyta (mosses (685)), Cycadophyta (cycads (42)), Lycopodiophyta (Lycophytes(45)), Marchantiophyta (liverworts (376)), Pinophyta (conifers (33)), and Pteridophyta (cryptogams (408)).

Five families are represented in the literature. Listed taxa include species, subspecies, varieties, and forms as recorded, some of which have subsequently been allocated to other taxa as synonyms, in which cases the accepted taxon is appended to the listing. Multiple entries under alternative names reflect taxonomic revision over time.

Berberidaceae
Family: Berberidaceae,

Berberis
Genus Berberis:
 Berberis aristata DC. not indigenous, naturalised
 Berberis julianae C.K.Schneid. not indigenous, cultivated, naturalised, invasive
 Berberis thunbergii DC. not indigenous, naturalised, invasive

Mahonia
Genus Mahonia:
 Mahonia oiwakensis Hayata, not indigenous, cultivated, naturalised

Nandina
Genus Nandina:
 Nandina domestica Thunb. not indigenous, cultivated, naturalised, invasive

Fumariaceae
Family: Fumariaceae,

Cysticapnos
Genus Cysticapnos:
 Cysticapnos cracca (Cham. & Schltdl.) Liden, endemic
 Cysticapnos grandiflora Bernh. accepted as Cysticapnos vesicaria (L.) Fedde subsp. vesicaria, present
 Cysticapnos parviflora Liden, accepted as Cysticapnos vesicaria (L.) Fedde subsp. namaquensis J.C.Manning & Goldblatt, endemic
 Cysticapnos pruinosa (Bernh.) Liden, indigenous
 Cysticapnos vesicaria (L.) Fedde, indigenous
 Cysticapnos vesicaria (L.) Fedde forma brevilobus Fedde, accepted as Cysticapnos vesicaria (L.) Fedde subsp. vesicaria, present
 Cysticapnos vesicaria (L.) Fedde forma longilobus Fedde, accepted as Cysticapnos vesicaria (L.) Fedde subsp. vesicaria, present
 Cysticapnos vesicaria (L.) Fedde subsp. namaquensis J.C.Manning & Goldblatt, indigenous
 Cysticapnos vesicaria (L.) Fedde subsp. vesicaria, indigenous

Discocapnos
Genus Discocapnos:
 Discocapnos mundii Cham. & Schltdl. endemic
 Discocapnos mundii Cham. & Schltdl. subsp. dregei (Harv.) J.C.Manning & Goldblatt, endemic
 Discocapnos mundii Cham. & Schltdl. subsp. mundii, indigenous

Fumaria
Genus Fumaria:
 Fumaria capreolata L. not indigenous, naturalised
 Fumaria muralis Sond. ex W.D.J.Koch subsp. muralis, not indigenous, naturalised, invasive
 Fumaria parviflora Lam. var. parviflora, not indigenous, naturalised

Phacocapnos
Genus Phacocapnos:
 Phacocapnos dregeanus Bernh. accepted as Cysticapnos cracca (Cham. & Schltdl.) Liden, present

Trigonocapnos
Genus Trigonocapnos:
 Trigonocapnos curvipes Schltr. accepted as Trigonocapnos lichtensteinii (Cham. & Schltdl.) Liden, present
 Trigonocapnos lichtensteinii (Cham. & Schltdl.) Liden, endemic

Menispermaceae
Family: Menispermaceae,

Albertisia
Genus Albertisia:
 Albertisia delagoensis (N.E.Br.) Forman, indigenous

Antizoma
Genus Antizoma:
 Antizoma angustifolia (Burch.) Miers ex Harv. indigenous
 Antizoma miersiana Harv. indigenous

Cissampelos
Genus Cissampelos:
 Cissampelos capensis L.f. indigenous
 Cissampelos hirta Klotzsch, indigenous
 Cissampelos mucronata A.Rich. indigenous
 Cissampelos torulosa E.Mey. ex Harv. indigenous

Cocculus
Genus Cocculus:
 Cocculus hirsutus (L.) Diels, not indigenous, naturalised

Stephania
Genus Stephania:
 Stephania abyssinica (Quart.-Dill. & A.Rich.) Walp. indigenous
 Stephania abyssinica (Quart.-Dill. & A.Rich.) Walp. var. abyssinica, indigenous
 Stephania abyssinica (Quart.-Dill. & A.Rich.) Walp. var. tomentella (Oliv.) Diels, indigenous

Tiliacora
Genus Tiliacora:
 Tiliacora funifera (Miers) Oliv. indigenous

Tinospora
Genus Tinospora:
 Tinospora caffra (Miers) Troupin, indigenous
 Tinospora fragosa (I.Verd.) I.Verd. & Troupin, indigenous
 Tinospora fragosa (I.Verd.) I.Verd. & Troupin subsp. fragosa, indigenous
 Tinospora tenera Miers, indigenous

Papaveraceae
 Family: Papaveraceae,

Argemone
Genus Argemone:
 Argemone albiflora Hornem. subsp. texana G.B.Ownbey, not indigenous, naturalised, invasive
 Argemone mexicana L. not indigenous, naturalised, invasive
 Argemone mexicana L. forma mexicana, not indigenous, naturalised, invasive
 Argemone ochroleuca Sweet, not indigenous, naturalised, invasive
 Argemone ochroleuca Sweet subsp. ochroleuca, not indigenous, naturalised, invasive

Bocconia
Genus Bocconia:
 Bocconia frutescens L. not indigenous, cultivated, naturalised

Eschscholzia
Genus Eschscholzia:
 Eschscholzia californica Cham. subsp. californica, not indigenous, cultivated, naturalised

Glaucium
Genus Glaucium:
 Glaucium corniculatum (L.) Rudolph, not indigenous, naturalised

Papaver
Genus Papaver:
 Papaver aculeatum Thunb. indigenous
 Papaver argemone L. not indigenous, naturalised
 Papaver hybridum L. not indigenous, naturalised
 Papaver rhoeas L. not indigenous, naturalised

Ranunculaceae
 Family: Ranunculaceae,

Adonis
Genus Adonis:
 Adonis capensis L. accepted as Anemone knowltonia Burtt Davy, indigenous
 Adonis filia L.f. accepted as Anemone filia (L.f.) J.C.Manning & Goldblatt subsp. filia, indigenous
 Adonis vesicatoria L.f. accepted as Anemone vesicatoria (L.f.) Prantl subsp. vesicatoria, indigenous

Anamenia
Genus Anamenia:
 Anamenia capensis (L.f.) Hoffmanns. accepted as Anemone knowltonia Burtt Davy, indigenous
 Anamenia gracilis Vent. accepted as Anemone knowltonia Burtt Davy, indigenous

Anemone
Genus Anemone:
 Anemone alchemillifolia E.Mey. ex Pritz. accepted as Anemone caffra (Eckl. & Zeyh.) Harv. indigenous
 Anemone alchemillifolia E.Mey. ex Pritz. var. caffra (Eckl. & Zeyh.) Huth, accepted as Anemone caffra (Eckl. & Zeyh.) Harv. indigenous
 Anemone alchemillifolia E.Mey. ex Pritz. var. grandiflora Huth, accepted as Anemone caffra (Eckl. & Zeyh.) Harv. indigenous
 Anemone alchemillifolia E.Mey. ex Pritz. var. schlechteriana Huth, accepted as Anemone caffra (Eckl. & Zeyh.) Harv. indigenous
 Anemone anemonoides (H.Rasm.) J.C.Manning & Goldblatt, indigenous
 Anemone anemonoides (H.Rasm.) J.C.Manning & Goldblatt subsp. anemonoides, endemic
 Anemone anemonoides (H.Rasm.) J.C.Manning & Goldblatt subsp. tenuis (H.Rasm.) J.C.Manning & Goldblat, endemic
 Anemone arborea Steud. accepted as Anemone tenuifolia (L.f.) DC. 
 Anemone bracteata (Harv. ex J.Zahlbr.) J.C.Manning & Goldblatt, endemic
 Anemone brevistylis (Szyszyl.) J.C.Manning & Goldblatt, endemic
 Anemone caffra (Eckl. & Zeyh.) Harv. endemic
 Anemone caffra (Eckl. & Zeyh.) Harv. var. pondoensis Ulbr. accepted as Anemone caffra (Eckl. & Zeyh.) Harv. indigenous
 Anemone canescens (Szyszyl.) Burtt Davy, accepted as Anemone transvaalensis (Szyszyl.) Burtt Davy var. transvaalensis, indigenous
 Anemone capensis (L.) DC. accepted as Anemone tenuifolia (L.f.) DC. 
 Anemone capensis Lam. accepted as Anemone tenuifolia (L.f.) DC. indigenous
 Anemone cordata (H.Rasm.) J.C.Manning & Goldblatt, endemic
 Anemone fanninii Harv. ex Mast. indigenous
 Anemone fanninii Harv. ex Mast. var. mafubensis Beauverd, accepted as Anemone fanninii Harv. ex Mast. indigenous
 Anemone fanninii Harv. ex Mast. var. parviflora Ulbr. accepted as Anemone fanninii Harv. ex Mast. indigenous
 Anemone filia (L.f.) J.C.Manning & Goldblatt, endemic
 Anemone filia (L.f.) J.C.Manning & Goldblatt subsp. filia, endemic
 Anemone filia (L.f.) J.C.Manning & Goldblatt subsp. scaposa (H.Rasm.) J.C.Manning & Goldblatt, endemic
 Anemone knowltonia Burtt Davy, endemic
 Anemone peenensis Baker f. accepted as Anemone transvaalensis (Szyszyl.) Burtt Davy var. transvaalensis 
 Anemone tenuifolia (L.f.) DC. endemic
 Anemone transvaalensis (Szyszyl.) Burtt Davy, indigenous
 Anemone transvaalensis (Szyszyl.) Burtt Davy var. filifolia (H.Rasm.) J.C.Manning & Goldblatt, endemic
 Anemone transvaalensis (Szyszyl.) Burtt Davy var. pottiana (Burtt Davy) J.C.Manning & Goldblatt, endemic
 Anemone transvaalensis (Szyszyl.) Burtt Davy var. transvaalensis, indigenous
 Anemone vesicatoria (L.f.) Prantl, endemic
 Anemone vesicatoria (L.f.) Prantl subsp. grossa (H.Rasm.) J.C.Manning & Goldblatt, endemic
 Anemone vesicatoria (L.f.) Prantl subsp. humilis (H.Rasm.) J.C.Manning & Goldblatt, endemic
 Anemone vesicatoria (L.f.) Prantl subsp. vesicatoria, endemic
 Anemone whyteana Baker f. accepted as Anemone transvaalensis (Szyszyl.) Burtt Davy var. transvaalensis

Atragene
Genus Atragene:
 Atragene capensis L. accepted as Anemone tenuifolia (L.f.) DC. indigenous
 Atragene tenuifolia L.f. accepted as Anemone tenuifolia (L.f.) DC. 
 Atragene tenuis Thunb. accepted as Anemone tenuifolia (L.f.) DC. indigenous

Batrachium
Genus Batrachium:
 Batrachium trichophyllus (Chaix) Bosch, accepted as Ranunculus trichophyllus Chaix, indigenous

Clematis
Genus Clematis:
 Clematis bowkeri Burtt Davy ex W.T.Wang, endemic
 Clematis brachiata Thunb. indigenous
 Clematis brachiata Thunb. var. burkei Burtt Davy, accepted as Clematis brachiata Thunb. indigenous
 Clematis brachiata Thunb. var. oweniae (Harv.) Durand & Schinz, accepted as Clematis oweniae Harv. indigenous
 Clematis capensis (L.) Poir. accepted as Anemone tenuifolia (L.f.) DC. 
 Clematis commutata Kuntze var. glabrisepala W.T.Wang, accepted as Clematis bowkeri Burtt Davy ex W.T.Wang, indigenous
 Clematis hirsuta Perr. & Guill. indigenous
 Clematis hirsuta Perr. & Guill. var. junodii (Burtt Davy) W.T.Wang, indigenous
 Clematis massoniana DC. endemic
 Clematis orientalis L. subsp. thunbergii (Steud.) Kuntze, accepted as Clematis triloba Thunb. indigenous
 Clematis orientalis L. subsp. thunbergii (Steud.) Kuntze var. oweniae, accepted as Clematis oweniae Harv. indigenous
 Clematis orientalis L. var. albida (Klotzsch) Kuntze forma massoniana, accepted as Clematis massoniana DC. indigenous
 Clematis oweniae Harv. indigenous
 Clematis oweniae Harv. var. junodii Burtt Davy, accepted as Clematis hirsuta Perr. & Guill. var. junodii (Burtt Davy) W.T.Wang, indigenous
 Clematis stanleyi Hook. accepted as Clematis villosa DC. subsp. stanleyi (Hook.) Kuntze, indigenous
 Clematis stewartiae Burtt Davy, accepted as Clematis brachiata Thunb. indigenous
 Clematis stewartiae Burtt Davy var. wilmsii Burtt Davy, accepted as Clematis brachiata Thunb. indigenous
 Clematis tenuifolia (L.f.) Poir. accepted as Anemone tenuifolia (L.f.) DC. 
 Clematis thunbergii Steud. accepted as Clematis triloba Thunb. indigenous
 Clematis triloba Thunb. indigenous
 Clematis villosa DC. indigenous
 Clematis villosa DC. subsp. stanleyi (Hook.) Kuntze, indigenous

Clematopsis
Genus Clematopsis:
 Clematopsis scabiosifolia (DC.) Hutch. subsp. stanleyi (Hook.) Brummitt, accepted as Clematis villosa DC. subsp. stanleyi (Hook.) Kuntze, indigenous
 Clematopsis stanleyi (Hook.) Hutch. accepted as Clematis villosa DC. subsp. stanleyi (Hook.) Kuntze, indigenous
 Clematopsis villosa (DC.) Hutch. subsp. stanleyi (Hook.) J.Raynal & Brummitt, accepted as Clematis villosa DC. subsp. stanleyi (Hook.) Kuntze, indigenous

Knowltonia
Genus Knowltonia:
 Knowltonia anemonoides H.Rasm. accepted as Anemone anemonoides (H.Rasm.) J.C.Manning & Goldblatt subsp. anemonoides, endemic
 Knowltonia anemonoides H.Rasm. subsp. tenuis H.Rasm. accepted as Anemone anemonoides (H.Rasm.) J.C.Manning & Goldblatt subsp. tenuis (H.Rasm.) J.C.Manning & Goldblat, endemic
 Knowltonia bracteata Harv. ex J.Zahlbr. accepted as Anemone bracteata (Harv. ex J.Zahlbr.) J.C.Manning & Goldblatt, endemic
 Knowltonia brevistylis Szyszyl. accepted as Anemone brevistylis (Szyszyl.) J.C.Manning & Goldblatt, endemic
 Knowltonia canescens Szyszyl. accepted as Anemone transvaalensis (Szyszyl.) Burtt Davy var. transvaalensis 
 Knowltonia canescens Szyszyl. var. pottiana Burtt Davy, accepted as Anemone transvaalensis (Szyszyl.) Burtt Davy var. pottiana (Burtt Davy) J.C.Manning & Goldblatt, indigenous
 Knowltonia capensis (L.) Huth, accepted as Anemone knowltonia Burtt Davy, endemic
 Knowltonia cordata H.Rasm. accepted as Anemone cordata (H.Rasm.) J.C.Manning & Goldblatt, endemic
 Knowltonia filia (L.f.) T.Durand & Schinz, accepted as Anemone filia (L.f.) J.C.Manning & Goldblatt subsp. filia, indigenous
 Knowltonia filia (L.f.) T.Durand & Schinz subsp. scaposa H.Rasm. accepted as Anemone filia (L.f.) J.C.Manning & Goldblatt subsp. scaposa (H.Rasm.) J.C.Manning & Goldblatt, endemic
 Knowltonia gracilis (Vent.) DC. accepted as Anemone knowltonia Burtt Davy, indigenous
 Knowltonia multiflora Burtt Davy, accepted as Anemone transvaalensis (Szyszyl.) Burtt Davy var. transvaalensis 
 Knowltonia transvaalensis Szyszyl. accepted as Anemone transvaalensis (Szyszyl.) Burtt Davy var. transvaalensis, indigenous
 Knowltonia transvaalensis Szyszyl. var. filifolia H.Rasm. accepted as Anemone transvaalensis (Szyszyl.) Burtt Davy var. filifolia (H.Rasm.) J.C.Manning & Goldblatt, endemic
 Knowltonia transvaalensis Szyszyl. var. pottiana (Burtt Davy) H.Rasm. accepted as Anemone transvaalensis (Szyszyl.) Burtt Davy var. pottiana (Burtt Davy) J.C.Manning & Goldblatt, endemic
 Knowltonia vesicatoria (L.f.) Sims, accepted as Anemone vesicatoria (L.f.) Prantl subsp. vesicatoria, indigenous
 Knowltonia vesicatoria (L.f.) Sims subsp. grossa H.Rasm. accepted as Anemone vesicatoria (L.f.) Prantl subsp. grossa (H.Rasm.) J.C.Manning & Goldblatt, endemic
 Knowltonia vesicatoria (L.f.) Sims subsp. humilis H.Rasm. accepted as Anemone vesicatoria (L.f.) Prantl subsp. humilis (H.Rasm.) J.C.Manning & Goldblatt, endemic
 Knowltonia whyteana (Baker f.) Engl. accepted as Anemone transvaalensis (Szyszyl.) Burtt Davy var. transvaalensis

Myosurus
Genus Myosurus:
 Myosurus minimus L. not indigenous, naturalised
 Myosurus minimus L. subsp. heldreichii (H.Lev.) O.BolÃ²s & Vigo, not indigenous, naturalised, invasive

Peltocalathos
Genus Peltocalathos:
 Peltocalathos baurii (MacOwan) Tamura, indigenous

Pulsatilla
Genus Pulsatilla:
 Pulsatilla africana Herm. ex Spreng. accepted as Anemone tenuifolia (L.f.) DC. 
 Pulsatilla tenuifolia (L.f.) Spreng. accepted as Anemone tenuifolia (L.f.) DC.

Ranunculus
Genus Ranunculus:
 Ranunculus baurii MacOwan, accepted as Peltocalathos baurii (MacOwan) Tamura, indigenous
 Ranunculus capensis Thunb. accepted as Ranunculus multifidus Forssk. endemic
 Ranunculus cooperi Oliv. accepted as Peltocalathos baurii (MacOwan) Tamura, indigenous
 Ranunculus dregei J.C.Manning & Goldblatt, indigenous
 Ranunculus meyeri Harv. accepted as Ranunculus dregei J.C.Manning & Goldblatt, indigenous
 Ranunculus meyeri Harv. var. rogersii Burtt Davy, accepted as Ranunculus dregei J.C.Manning & Goldblatt, present
 Ranunculus meyeri Harv. var. transvaalensis Szyszyl. accepted as Ranunculus dregei J.C.Manning & Goldblatt, indigenous
 Ranunculus multifidus Forssk. indigenous
 Ranunculus muricatus L. not indigenous, naturalised, invasive
 Ranunculus pinnatus Poir. var. hermannii DC. accepted as Ranunculus multifidus Forssk. indigenous
 Ranunculus pubescens Thunb. accepted as Ranunculus multifidus Forssk. indigenous
 Ranunculus pubescens Thunb. var. glabrescens Burtt Davy, accepted as Ranunculus multifidus Forssk. indigenous
 Ranunculus pubescens Thunb. var. harveyanus Burtt Davy, accepted as Ranunculus multifidus Forssk. indigenous
 Ranunculus trichophyllus Chaix, indigenous

Thalictrum
Genus Thalictrum:
 Thalictrum minus L. indigenous
 Thalictrum rhynchocarpum Quart.-Dill. & A.Rich. indigenous

References

South African plant biodiversity lists
Ranunculales